The Halidae were a tiny spider family with only three described species in two genera. , this family was no longer considered valid; the two genera are instead grouped in the family Pisauridae.

Distribution
This family is endemic to Madagascar.

Species
Hala Jocqué, 1994
 Hala impigra Jocqué, 1994  (Madagascar)
 Hala paulyi Jocqué, 1994 (Madagascar)

Tolma Jocqué, 1994
 Tolma toreuta Jocqué, 1994  (Madagascar)

See also
 List of Pisauridae species

References

 Jocqué, R. (1994b). Halidae, a new spider family from Madagascar (Araneae). Bull. Br. arachnol. Soc. 9: 281-289.

External links

 Picture of unidentified Halidae species
 

Historically recognized spider taxa